Nevada Industrial Switch is an active private railroad in Nevada, United States. The railroad runs over Union Pacific's former "Fibreboard Spur". The line serves the PABCO Gypsum Mine that produces sheet rock. Nevada Industrial Switch was contracted by PABCO Gypsum to service the mine.

Directions
"Apex" is on Union Pacific Railroad's Caliente Subdivision at Milepost 352. It is located off Exit 58 on Interstate 15/U.S. Route 93 at Apex. Apex is at the top of a 1% grade on the mainline.

See also

 List of Nevada railroads
 PABCO Gypsum Website
 Nevada Industrial Switch Locomotive Photo (on bottom of page)

References

Rail transportation in Nevada
Union Pacific Railroad